Ganesh Raghavendra is an Indian film score and soundtrack composer, who has predominantly scored music for Tamil films.

He has won Two Best Film score (BGM) Awards for Vinveli Payana kurippugal at Cult critict movie awards, Kolkata & L’Age d’Or International Arthouse Film Festival (LIAFF), Kolkata, India.

Career
Ganesh Raghavendra began his career with orchestra named Rasigapriya. Later he began scoring music for devotional albums, jingles and short films. 

His first film, Renigunta (2009), won him positive reviews and it was followed by Padam Paarthu Kathai Sol.Aachariyangal (2012). He later worked on the Vijay Vasanth-starrer Mathil Mel Poonai (2013) and the Dhansika-starrer Thiranthidu Seese (2015).

He is the music producer for international corporate companies like ZOHO etc...

Discography

References

Living people
Tamil film score composers
Telugu film score composers
Musicians from Chennai
1979 births